Downlink CNR (Carrier to noise ratio in satellite reception) is an important figure in system TVRO design. Below are certain parameters used in CNR computation.

Figure of merit

Figure of merit is given as 

Where t is the temperature and g is the gain of the receiver antenna.
For lossless case

and

where n is the noise factor, ta is the noise temperature of the antenna and t0 is the temperature of the environment (taken as 2900K). 
F in db is simply

Path loss

Path loss is defined as

Where  is the wavelength of the carrier and the d is the distance in meters between the satellite and the receiver . In actual cases the distance is slightly more than this figure depending on the geographic location. (But for geosynchronous satellites the variation is less than 1%). The Path loss in dB is

The same relation can be given in terms of frequency.

Where c is the velocity of light.

With metric units 

Using km for d and GHz for f 

Using miles for d and GHz for f

EIRP 

Pe is the Equivalent isotropically radiated power (also known as EIRP) in dBW. It depends on the output of the transponders of the satellite and the antenna gain of the transmitting antenna. This figure is given by the service provider.

where  p is the output power of the transponder and g is the antenna gain.

Baseband 

B is the baseband of the channel given in dB

Where b is the base band given in metric units (Hz).

When b is given in MHz, than

Boltzmann constant 
K is the Boltzmann constant given in dB units.

CNR in dB units

References

Broadcast engineering